Bombus perezi is a species of bumblebee native to the islands of Corsica and Elba. It is also reported from Greece.

This is a cuckoo bumblebee, one that lives in the nest of another bee. One host for this species is likely the buff-tailed bumblebee (B. terrestris).

References

Bumblebees
Insects described in 1886
Hymenoptera of Europe